Joyce Mary Hawkins (1928–1992) was a lexicographer and the editor of a number of dictionaries.

Joyce Hawkins studied classics at St Hugh's College, Oxford.

Hawkins initially worked on a Patristic Greek dictionary, published in 1961 by Oxford University Press (OUP). She then worked on the Oxford English Dictionary Supplement. In this role, she read most of the works of P. G. Wodehouse for quotations. Later she was sole editor or joint editor of many OUP dictionaries, working on these until her retirement in 1991. She also appeared briefly in "Dictionary Corner" on the British television game show Countdown.

Hawkins edited the following dictionaries, published by Oxford University Press (some posthumously):

 The Oxford Illustrated Dictionary, with Jessie Coulson, et al., 1975
 The Oxford Minidictionary, 1981
 The St Michael Oxford Dictionary, 1981
 The Oxford Senior Dictionary, 1982
 The Oxford Paperback Dictionary, 1988
 The Oxford Reference Dictionary, 1989
 The Oxford Study Dictionary, 1994
 The Oxford Large Print Dictionary, 1995
 The Oxford Popular Dictionary & Thesaurus, with Sara Hawker, 1995
 The Oxford School Dictionary, 1996
 The Oxford Popular Dictionary, 1998
 The Oxford Pocket School Dictionary, with Andrew Delahunty, et al., 2000
 The Oxford Popular English Dictionary, with Lucinda Coventry, et al., 2000
 Oxford School Dictionary, with Robert Allen, Andrew Delahunty, et al., 2002
 Oxford Concise School Dictionary'', with Andrew Delahunty, et al., 2003

Hawkins died in 1992.

References

1928 births
1992 deaths
Alumni of St Hugh's College, Oxford
20th-century lexicographers
English lexicographers
English book editors
Oxford University Press people
Women lexicographers